The HP 33s (F2216A) was a scientific calculator marketed by Hewlett-Packard. It was introduced in 2003 as the successor to the HP 32SII, and discontinued on the introduction of its successor the HP 35s in 2007.

Features
Its main features are:
 RPN or traditional semi-algebraic (infix data/algebraic operator entry/postfix one-number function entry), user-selectable
 Two-line LCD display
 Full scientific/engineering mathematical features
 Keystroke-programmable with full boolean and program-control command sets and line edit, insert and delete
 HP "equation list" equation editor (fully algebraic) in both the stand-alone list as well as in keystroke programs
 HP Solver feature (solves equations and functions for one unknown)
 Function integration feature
 All mathematical operations and features fully functional in all modes
 Unit conversion and constants
 31 KB of random-access user memory (equivalent to about 7 KB on earlier HP programmable models)

The main differences from the HP 32SII are:
 A radical difference in keypad layout and appearance
 Memory is expanded from 2 KB to 32 KB
 Faster processor
 More functions
 Algebraic entry mode as well as RPN
 The display has two lines
 The length of an equation was now restricted to 255 characters (no arbitrary limit in the 32SII)

The HP 33s was co-designed and manufactured by Kinpo Electronics of Taiwan.

Reception
The 33s is generally considered to have fewer logic bugs than the HP 35s. However, the unconventional chevron-styled keypad has been regarded by reviewers as bizarre and difficult to use compared to other HP professional calculators.

Revisions
The 33s went through numerous revisions that have solved two of the most pervasive issues people had with the early models (namely poor screen quality and bad keypad responsiveness).

See also
 List of Hewlett-Packard products: Pocket calculators
 HP calculators

References

External links
 
 
 

33s